Hernâni José Oliveira Santos Borges (born 27 August 1981 in Maia, Portugal), known simply as Hernâni, is a Cape Verdean former professional footballer who played as a forward.

External links

1981 births
Living people
People from Maia, Portugal
Citizens of Cape Verde through descent
Portuguese sportspeople of Cape Verdean descent
Sportspeople from Porto District
Cape Verdean footballers
Portuguese footballers
Association football forwards
Primeira Liga players
Liga Portugal 2 players
Segunda Divisão players
F.C. Pedras Rubras players
U.S.C. Paredes players
C.D. Trofense players
C.D. Aves players
S.C. Beira-Mar players
C.D. Santa Clara players
F.C. Penafiel players
C.F. União players
Leixões S.C. players
S.C. Farense players
Varzim S.C. players
Sport Benfica e Castelo Branco players
S.C. Salgueiros players
U.D. Leiria players
Cypriot First Division players
Alki Larnaca FC players
Swiss Challenge League players
FC Wil players
Cape Verde international footballers
Cape Verdean expatriate footballers
Expatriate footballers in Portugal
Expatriate footballers in Cyprus
Expatriate footballers in Switzerland
Portuguese expatriate sportspeople in Cyprus